Prime Cuts & Glazed Donuts is a collection of previously recorded demos released by manager Mark Dawson and Linda McDonald of the American all-female heavy metal band Phantom Blue. Songwriters Michelle Meldrum and Nicole Couch and bassist Kim Nielsen were no longer in the band. The tracks were recorded by the original members during their pre-production days with Geffen Records, with the exception of "Saturday Morning Brain Damage", which was recorded before the band signed with Shrapnel Records. Debra Armstrong (formerly Phantom Blue) was the bassist on this particular track. "Strange Blue Mercy" and "Mutha" were originally released in the "My Misery" single in 1993.

Track listing
All songs written by Michelle Meldrum and Nicole Couch except where indicated.

Personnel
Phantom Blue
Gigi Hangach – vocals
Michelle Meldrum – guitar
Nicole Couch - guitar
Kim Nielsen – bass guitar
Linda McDonald – drums

Additional musicians
Debra Armstrong - bass on "Saturday Morning Brain Damage"

References 

1995 albums
Phantom Blue albums
Self-released albums